The 1972 Bucknell Bison football team was an American football team that represented Bucknell University as an independent during the 1972 NCAA College Division football season.

In their fourth year under head coach Fred Prender, the Bison compiled a 6–3 record. Steve Eck and Gerry Solomon were the team captains. 

Bucknell played its home games at Memorial Stadium on the university campus in Lewisburg, Pennsylvania.

Schedule

References

Bucknell
Bucknell Bison football seasons
Bucknell Bison football